Isabel Castañe (born 10 February 1946) is a Spanish former breaststroke and medley swimmer. She competed at the 1960 Summer Olympics and the 1964 Summer Olympics.

References

External links
 

1946 births
Living people
Spanish female breaststroke swimmers
Spanish female medley swimmers
Olympic swimmers of Spain
Swimmers at the 1960 Summer Olympics
Swimmers at the 1964 Summer Olympics
Swimmers from Barcelona
20th-century Spanish women